Ernest Gutierrez is the former mayor of El Monte, California. He is a registered Democrat.

Career
Gutierrez was elected to the El Monte City Council in 2001 and was elected mayor two years later in 2003. He has been re-elected two times.

Controversy
Gutierrez was the subject of negative publicity throughout 2008. He was accused of being intoxicated at a city-sponsored event, implementing improvements on the street on which his girlfriend, Graciela Solano, lives, and being arrested for domestic violence.

References

External links
Official El Monte website profile

Living people
Mayors of places in California
People from El Monte, California
Year of birth missing (living people)
Hispanic and Latino American mayors in California
Hispanic and Latino American politicians